The Minister of Economy and Finance is a senior member of the Italian Cabinet who leads the Ministry of Economy and Finance since its creation in 2001 by the fusion of three former ministries, the Ministry of Treasury, the Ministry of Budget and the Ministry of Finance.

The first Minister of Economy and Finance was Giulio Tremonti, of Forza Italia, while the current office holder is Giancarlo Giorgetti, who has been acting as minister since 22 October 2022.

List of ministers of Finance, Treasury and Budget (1946–2001)

List of ministers of Economy and Finance (2001–present)
 Parties

 Governments

Timeline

See also
Politics of Italy

References

External links
 Official website

Economy and Finance